Chernivtsi Philharmonic Hall (from Ukrainian, literally: Chernivtsi Regional Philharmonic - Чернівецька обласна філармонія) is part of the network of state philharmonic halls in Ukraine located in the central part of Chernivtsi, Ukraine.

Original hall 

The current hall was completed in 1876-1877 as a concert hall of the Ukrainian Music Society.

Recent history 

The entity "Chernivtsi Philharmonic Hall" was founded in 1940. Organ and chamber music music hall was opened on 18 August 1992, on the anniversary of the Ukrainian independence.

Concert programmes

The hall is the home, rehearsal and concert venue of musicians and musical bands playing classical but also folk music.

The hall is the venue of music competitions and hosted such musicians as Enrico Caruso, Solomiya Krushelnytska, Feodor Chaliapin, Mykola Lysenko, Sidi Tal.

Today, the hall still hosts a number of music classes.

In 1944, the Bukovina Song and Dance Ensemble of Ukraine was founded. The Chamber Orchestra performs since 1975, and in 1978, it won the Republican competition of chamber music ensembles in Kiev. In 1992 was founded the Chernivtsi Philharmonic Symphony Orchestra, in 1993 - the Chamber Choir. The philharmonic hall became the starting point of such performers as Jan Tabachnik, Sofia Rotaru and Sophia Agranovich.

External links
 Official site
 Yan Tabachnik's interview (Russian)
Official site of Sophia Agranovich
 Чернівецька обласна філармонія — Official Site of Chernivtsi City Hall

References 

Culture in Chernivtsi
Concert halls in Ukraine
Classical music in Ukraine
Buildings and structures in Chernivtsi
Tourist attractions in Chernivtsi